The Girl from Rio is a 1969 spy-fi film directed by Jess Franco and starring Shirley Eaton, Richard Wyler, George Sanders and Maria Rohm. Written and produced by Harry Alan Towers, the film follows a tribe of Amazonian women, as, led by their queen, they attack wealthy men as part of a long-term plan to take over the world. A co-production between West Germany, Spain and the United States, the film is a sequel to The Million Eyes of Sumuru (1967), and is based on Sax Rohmer's Sumuru character. Nevertheless, Sumuru's character is referred to as either "Sumitra" or "Sununda".

Plot
Secret agent Jeff Sutton arrives in Rio with $10 million and finds himself embroiled in a war between Sir Masius, a British mobster, and the megalomaniacal Sumuru. From her secret city, "Femina", Sumuru assembles an army of women with which she will conquer the world. Masius, hoping to find Femina and steal Sumuru's riches, tries to use Sutton as his pawn. Ultimately, Sutton leads a squadron of helicopters on an attack on Femina. Knowing that she is beaten, Sumuru chooses to destroy Femina rather than let Masius have its wealth. Sutton barely makes it out of Femina before it self-destructs, presumably killing both Sumuru and Masius. Nevertheless, the film concludes with Sumuru aboard a ship leaving Rio, joined by a group of women who are apparently her followers.

Cast

Release
The Girl from Rio was released in West Germany on March 14, 1969.

See also
 List of American films of 1968

References

External links

1969 films
1960s science fiction thriller films
1960s spy thriller films
American science fiction thriller films
American spy thriller films
1960s English-language films
English-language German films
English-language Spanish films
Films directed by Jesús Franco
Films set in Rio de Janeiro (city)
West German films
German science fiction thriller films
German spy thriller films
Spanish science fiction thriller films
Spanish spy thriller films
Parody films based on James Bond films
1960s American films
1960s German films
1960s Spanish films